Patrick J. Hartnett (October 20, 1863 – April 10, 1935) was a professional baseball player. Nicknamed "Happy", he played part of one season in Major League Baseball for the St. Louis Browns in 1890.

External links

Major League Baseball first basemen
St. Louis Browns (AA) players
Portland (minor league baseball) players
Newburyport Clamdiggers players
Boston Blues players
Lowell Magicians players
Toronto Canucks players
St. Paul Apostles players
Providence Clamdiggers (baseball) players
Brockton Shoemakers players
Baseball players from Boston
19th-century baseball players
1863 births
1935 deaths